Everything I Have Is Yours is a 1952 American Technicolor musical film.

Plot summary
The husband and wife dance team, Chuck and Pamela Hubbard (Gower Champion and Marge Champion), are a pair of happily married dancers. The Hubbards have dreamed for years of taking their act to Broadway, and after much hard work and perseverance, they finally get their shot at the big time, only to discover that Pamela is pregnant, and her doctor forbids her to dance.

Cast
 Marge Champion as Pamela Hubbard
 Gower Champion as Chuck Hubbard
 Dennis O'Keefe as Alec Tacksbury
 Monica Lewis as Sybil Meriden
 Dean Miller as Monty Dunstan
 Eduard Franz as Phil Meisner
 John Gallaudet as Ed Holly
 Diane Cassidy as Showgirl
 Elaine Stewart as Showgirl
 Jonathan Cott as Freddie
 Robert Burton as Doctor Charles
 Jean Fenwick as Mrs. Tirson
 Mimi Gibson as Pamela (age 3)
 William Kerwin as Larry
 Wilson Wood as Roy Tirson

Reception
According to MGM records, the film earned $1,359,000 in the US and Canada and $587,000 elsewhere, resulting in a loss of $459,000.

References

External links
 
 
 
 

1953 films
1950s musical comedy films
1952 romantic comedy films
American musical comedy films
American romantic comedy films
American romantic musical films
Metro-Goldwyn-Mayer films
Films directed by Robert Z. Leonard
Films scored by David Rose
Films with screenplays by George Wells
1950s romantic musical films
1952 films
1950s English-language films
1950s American films